The list of shipwrecks in 1807 includes ships sunk, wrecked or otherwise lost during 1807.

January

1 January

4 January

9 January

12 January

13 January

15 January

16 January

17 January

20 January

22 January

23 January

25 January

27 January

Unknown date

February

2 February

3 February

7 February

8 February

10 February

11 February

12 February

13 February

14 February

15 February

16 February

17 February

18 February

19 February

24 February

25 February

26 February

27 February

28 February

Unknown date

March

1 March

4 March

5 March

6 March

8 March

9 March

10 March

13 March

14 March

15 March

16 March

17 March

18 March

19 March

21 March

23 March

25 March

26 March

27 March

30 March

31 March

Unknown date

April

1 April

2 April

5 April

6 April

10 April

11 April

14 April

17 April

20 April

25 April

26 April

28 April

29 April

30 April

Unknown date

May

3 May

8 May

11 May

12 May

13 May

14 May

16 May

18 May

19 May

29 May

30 May

Unknown date

June

8 June

12 June

17 June

21 June

24 June

27 June

29 June

Unknown date

July

1 July

3 July

7 July

12 July

17 July

19 July

20 July

23 July

25 July

26 July

27 July

29 July

Unknown date

August

8 August

11 August

13 August

17 August

18 August

25 August

28 August

29 August

30 August

31 August

Unknown date

September

4 September

5 September

6 September

8 September

9 September

10 September

11 September

12 September

13 September

15 September

28 September

29 September

30 September

Unknown date

October

2 October

4 October

6 October

7 October

8 October

9 October

10 October

12 October

14 October

16 October

 This is probably , lost on 14 October.

21 October

22 October

23 October

25 October

28 October

29 October

31 October

Unknown date

November

1 November

2 November

3 November

4 November

7 November

8 November

10 November

11 November

12 November

13 November

15 November

16 November

18 November

19 November

20 November

21 November

22 November

23 November

25 November

26 November

28 November

29 November

30 November

Unknown date

December

2 December

3 December

4 December

5 December

6 December

7 December

8 December

10 December

11 December

18 December

19 December

20 December

25 December

26 December

27 December

28 December

29 December

31 December

Unknown date

Unknown date

References

1807